Bambama is a town in the Lekoumou of Republic of the Congo located to the south. It is the capital of Bambama District.

References

Lékoumou Department